This article includes a list of the main Saudi cities sorted by their Gross Domestic Product (GDP) per capita,
the list includes 5 cities, Riyadh, Jeddah, Khobar, Dhahran and Dammam. The currency is sorted by the Saudi Riyal, which can also be worked out in the US Dollar.

Currently Dhahran is within the highest GDP per capita in the Middle East after Qatar. Ranking the first in Saudi Arabia, Dhahran's Economic development is however reaching at a high level.

See also
Al Jubail
List of Brazilian states by GDP per capita
Saudi Arabia
Middle East
List of countries by GDP (PPP) per capita

References 

 
Lists of cities by GDP
Economy of Saudi Arabia-related lists